The FIG Parkour World Championships are a parkour competition organized by the International Gymnastics Federation (FIG). Originally scheduled for 2020 and delayed due to the COVID-19 pandemic, the inaugural edition is being held from October 14, 2022, in Tokyo, Japan.

History 
International Gymnastics Federation (FIG) added parkour as one of their disciplines in 2017, causing international opposition from the parkour community who wanted to govern themselves.

The first FIG Parkour World Championships were scheduled to take place at Hiroshima on 3–5 April 2020, but were postponed as a result of the COVID-19 pandemic.

Editions

References 

 
Parkour